Alexandru "Elek" Schwartz (23 October 1908 – 2 October 2000) was a Romanian professional footballer and coach of the Netherlands national team. With S.L. Benfica he won the national Championship and Cup trophies of 1965 and led the club into the final of the European Champion Clubs' Cup.

Playing career

Elek Schwartz initially started playing near his hometown Recaş, in Timişoara. Later he played professional football in the French Ligue 1 with FC Hyères (1932–1934), AS Cannes (1934–36), Racing Strasbourg (1936–38) and Red Star Olympique (1938–39).

Coaching career

Beginnings as coach on the Côte d'Azur 
He started his coaching career in France with AS Cannes (1948–49) and from there continued to AS Monaco (1950–1952) and Le Havre AC (1952–53).

Early years in West Germany 
In 1953 he was hired by SF Hamborn 07. In his second season with the club from the suburb of Duisburg he led the club to promotion to the western division of the five ways split first division of Germany, the Oberliga West.

In 1955, he was appointed as manager by then German champions, Rot-Weiss Essen coaching among others Helmut Rahn there. In the next couple of years he led the team to ranks 4 and 8 in the Oberliga West.

Manager of the Netherlands national team 

After leaving Rot-Weiss Essen, Schwartz joined the Netherlands football association, the KNVB and took on the reins of the Netherlands national football team. He guided the team through 49 matches.

However, this was in an era when Dutch football had yet to achieve the standing it has held since the 1970s. Results varied extremely
and included 7–0 defeat to Germany in 1959 in Cologne, as well as back to back 1–0 wins against France and world champions Brazil in 1963. He held the position of national coach until 1964, when Denis Neville replaced him.

European Cup Final with Benfica 
In 1964–65, he coached Portuguese club S.L. Benfica, then with Eusébio. There he led them to their first third-consecutive league title.

After this, Benfica overcame Real Madrid in the quarterfinals of the European Cup of Champions and eventually even made it all the way to the final, where Benfica had to yield to the masters of the Catenaccio, the Helenio Herrera coached team of Inter Milan, who won 1–0, thus failing what would be Benfica's third European Cup title.

Bundesliga with Eintracht Frankfurt and FC Porto spell 
From July 1965 to June 1968 Schwartz coached – as successor to Ivica Horvat – Eintracht Frankfurt in the German Bundesliga. There he introduced the 4–2–4 system. Nevertheless, place 4 was as good as it got in the league. During the 1966–67 season he won the International Football Cup and the Coppa delle Alpi. In the same year he led his side to the semifinals of the Inter-Cities Fairs Cup.

In 1969–70, he coached FC Porto. Not only that the Dragons exited already in the first round of the national cup competition and in the second round of the Inter-Cities Fairs Cup – in the end Porto was only ninth in the league, the club's worst finishing ever.

End of the career in Munich and Strasbourg 
In the 1972–73 season, Schwartz coached TSV 1860 Munich, but he could not help them to fulfill their aspirations to return to the Bundesliga after then three years of absence.

He had more luck in 1976–77, when in the course of his last professional engagement he led Racing Strasbourg to promotion to the French Ligue 1.

After this he guided the Alsatian amateur side SR Haguenau, today's FCSR Haguenau, through the 1978–79 season.

Haguenau, he decided, was also a nice place for him to spend the rest of his life.

Tribute 
In 1996, he was invited by the Royal Dutch Football Association to the inauguration of the Amsterdam Arena.

References

External links

 Data about Elek Schwartz racingstub.com 
 Elek Schwartz at eintracht-archiv.de 
 

1908 births
2000 deaths
Sportspeople from Timișoara
People from the Kingdom of Hungary
Romanian footballers
Romanian football managers
Jewish Romanian sportspeople
Austro-Hungarian Jews
French people of Romanian-Jewish descent
CA Timișoara players
AS Cannes players
RC Strasbourg Alsace players
Red Star F.C. players
Ligue 1 players
Ligue 1 managers
Eintracht Frankfurt managers
Netherlands national football team managers
Expatriate footballers in France
Expatriate football managers in West Germany
Expatriate footballers in the Netherlands
Expatriate footballers in Portugal
Eredivisie managers
Bundesliga managers
AS Cannes managers
AS Monaco FC managers
Le Havre AC managers
Rot-Weiss Essen managers
S.L. Benfica managers
FC Porto managers
Sparta Rotterdam managers
TSV 1860 Munich managers
RC Strasbourg Alsace managers
Romanian expatriate sportspeople in Monaco
Romanian expatriate sportspeople in France
Romanian expatriate sportspeople in West Germany
Romanian expatriate sportspeople in the Netherlands
Romanian expatriate sportspeople in Portugal
Expatriate football managers in France
Expatriate football managers in Monaco
Expatriate football managers in the Netherlands
Expatriate football managers in Portugal
Association football defenders